USS Crossbill (AMc-9) was a coastal minesweeper of the United States Navy. Built in 1937 as North Star by the Watchorn Yacht and Boat Works, San Pedro, California, the ship was acquired by the U.S. Navy on 31 October 1940, and commissioned as USS Crossbill (AMc 9) on 22 March 1941. Crossbill operated in an in-service status attached to the 14th Naval District from 1941 to 1947. Crossbill was decommissioned in 1947. Fate unknown.

References

External links
 

Merchant ships of the United States
Ships built in Los Angeles
1937 ships
Minesweepers of the United States Navy
World War II minesweepers of the United States
Ships present during the attack on Pearl Harbor